Lamin B2 is a protein that in humans is encoded by the LMNB2 gene. It is the second of two type B nuclear lamins, and it is associated with laminopathies.

Model organisms

Model organisms have been used in the study of Lamin B2 function. A conditional knockout mouse line, called Lmnb2tm1a(KOMP)Wtsi was generated as part of the International Knockout Mouse Consortium program — a high-throughput mutagenesis project to generate and distribute animal models of disease to interested scientists.

Male and female animals underwent a standardized phenotypic screen to determine the effects of deletion. Twenty four tests were carried out on mutant mice and four significant abnormalities were observed.  No homozygous mutant embryos were identified during gestation, and therefore none survived until weaning. The remaining tests were carried out on heterozygous mutant adult mice. Male heterozygotes displayed increased circulating creatinine levels and an increased susceptibility to Salmonella infection.

See also
 Lamin B receptor
 Barraquer-Simons disease
 Pelger-Huet anomaly

External links

References

Genes mutated in mice